The Rainbow Codes were a series of code names used to disguise the nature of various British military research projects. They were mainly used by the Ministry of Supply from the end of the Second World War until 1958, when the ministry was broken up and its functions distributed among the forces. The codes were replaced by an alphanumeric code system.

History
During WWII, British intelligence was able to glean details of new German technologies simply by considering their code names. For instance, when they heard of a new system known as Wotan, Reginald Victor Jones asked around and found that Wotan was a one-eyed god. Based on this, he guessed it was a radio navigation system using a single radio beam. This proved correct, and the Royal Air Force was able to quickly render it useless through jamming.

Wishing to avoid making this sort of mistake, Ministry of Supply (MoS) initiated a system that would be entirely random and deliberately unrelated to the program in any way, while still being easy to remember. Each rainbow code name was constructed from a randomly selected colour, plus an (often appropriate) noun taken from a list, for example:
 "Blue" + "Steel" = Blue Steel, a nuclear-armed stand-off missile
 "Green" + "Mace" = Green Mace, an anti-aircraft (AA) gun.

While most colour and noun combinations were meaningless, some were real names, although quite unrelated to the project they designated. For example, "Black Maria" is also a name for a police van and the "Red Duster" is a name for the Red Ensign, the flag flown by British merchant ships. Some code names were not assigned through the official system, but created to sound like it. The Blue Yeoman radar is an example, an unofficial name created by combining the names of two other projects,  Blue Riband and Orange Yeoman.

The names were mostly dropped with the end of the Ministry in 1959. Its functions were split between the War Office, the Air Ministry, and the newly created Ministry of Aviation for civil aviation. After the reorganization, projects were mostly named with randomly selected codes comprising two letters and three digits, e.g. BL755, WE.177. Rainbow codes, or at least names that look like them without being official, have occasionally been used for some modern systems; current examples include the Orange Reaper Electronic Support Measures system and the Blue Vixen radar—the latter most likely so named because it was a replacement for the Blue Fox radar.

Projects

Black
 Black Arrow   – a satellite launch vehicle derived from Blue Streak/Black Knight
 Black Knight   – a launch vehicle used to test re-entry vehicles for Blue Streak
 Black Maria   – fighter IFF interrogator
 Black Prince   – proposed satellite launch vehicle based on Blue Streak/Black Knight — a.k.a. Blue Star
 Black Rock   – surface to surface guided missile

Blue
 Blue Anchor   – X-Band CW target illumination radar for Bristol Bloodhound – a.k.a. AMES Type 86
 Blue Badger   – truck-mounted nuclear land mine – later renamed Violet Mist
 Blue Bishop   – portable 2.5 MW nuclear-powered electrical generator – previously Green Janet
 Blue Boar   – TV-guided bomb
 Blue Boy   – VHF speech scrambling
 Blue Bunny   – ten-kiloton nuclear mine, see Blue Peacock
 Blue Cat   – nuclear warhead  a.k.a. Tony – UK version of US W44, a.k.a. Tsetse
 Blue Cedar   – AA No. 3 Mk. 7 mobile anti-aircraft radar
Blue Circle – Sarcastic nickname for concrete ballast fitted to early variants of the Panavia Tornado ADV in place of the AI.24 Foxhunter radar, after the concrete company Blue Circle Industries
 Blue Danube   – the first British nuclear weapon in service
 Blue Devil   – T4 optical bombsight – drift and ground speed from Green Satin
 Blue Diamond   – AA No. 7 anti-aircraft radar
 Blue Diver   – ARI (Airborne Radio Installation) 18075  airborne low-band VHF jammer – against metric frequency radar such as Tall King – fitted to Victor & Vulcan
 Blue Dolphin   – Blue Jay Mk V for Sea Vixen – see Hawker Siddeley Red Top
 Blue Duck   – Anti-Submarine Warfare missile, entered service as Ikara
 Blue Envoy   – surface-to-air missile to OR.1140, replaced Green Sparker as "Stage 2" SAM
 Blue Fox   – kiloton range nuclear weapon, later renamed Indigo Hammer – not to be confused with the later Blue Fox radar
 Blue Fox   – airborne radar
 Blue Jacket   – ARI (Airborne Radio Installation) 5880  airborne Doppler navigation radar fitted to Hawker-Siddeley Buccaneer aircraft.
 Blue Jay   – air-to-air missile – entered service as de Havilland Firestreak
 Blue Joker   – balloon-borne Early Warning radar – a.k.a. AMES Type 87
 Blue Kestrel – search radar
 Blue Label – AMES Type 84 radar
 Blue Lagoon – Infra-red air-to-air detector
 Blue Mercury – Centurion Crocodile flamethrower tank.
 Blue Moon   – nuclear-armed cruise missile project, replaced by Blue Streak
 Blue Oak  – AWRE Atlas 2 super-computer used for simulation of nuclear explosions
 Blue Orchid – Marconi doppler navigation equipment for helicopters
 Blue Parrot   – ARI 5930 I band automatic contour-following radar for Buccaneer – also known as AIRPASS II (AIRPASS=Airborne Interception Radar & Pilot's Attack Sight System)
 Blue Peacock   – ten-kiloton nuclear land mine – also known as Blue Bunny and Brown Bunny; it used the Blue Danube physics package.
 Blue Perseus – flamethrower kit for the Centurion Crocodile tank
 Blue Ranger – Delivery of Blue Steel to Australia
 Blue Rapier   – Red Rapier – missiles – see UB.109T
 Blue Riband  – large jamming-resistant radar. Cancelled 1958 and replaced by a smaller version as Blue Yeoman.
 Blue Rosette   – short-case nuclear weapon bomb casing for reconnaissance bomber to spec R156T, including the Avro 730, Handley Page HP.100, English Electric P10, Vickers SP4 and others.
 Blue Saga   – ARI 18105 airborne radar warning receiver (RWR) – fitted to Victor & Vulcan
 Blue Sapphire   – astro-navigation system – see also Orange Tartan
 Blue Shadow – navigation equipment for Canberra B.16, developed as Yellow Aster.
 Blue Shield – see Armstrong Whitworth Sea Slug
 Blue Silk  – airborne Doppler navigation radar unit with lower speed range than Green Satin
 Blue Sky  – see Fairey Fireflash
 Blue Slug  – heavy ship-to-ship missile using Sea Slug launcher, nuclear or conventional
 Blue Star  – satellite launcher – see Black Prince
 Blue Steel  – an air-launched rocket propelled nuclear stand-off missile
 Blue Stone  – Unit 386D ENI (Electronic Neutron Initiator) – nuclear weapon component
 Blue Streak  – a medium-range ballistic missile
 Blue Study  – automatic blind bombing system for V-bombers
 Blue Sugar  – air-droppable target marking radio beacon developed by TRE.
 Blue Vesta  – a later version of the Blue Jay air-to-air missile
 Blue Vixen  – Pulse-Doppler radar for Sea Harrier FA2
 Blue Warrior (EW) VHF/UHF Jammer countermeasure to use of Radar AA Shells
 Blue Water  – Nuclear-armed tactical surface-to-surface missile intended for Royal Artillery in West Germany. Also see Red Rose
 Blue Yeoman  – Early Warning radar, also known as AMES Type 85, a component Linesman. Name created from the "Blue" of Blue Riband and the Yeoman of Orange Yeoman. Potentially non-official name.

Brown
 Brown Bunny   – original, unofficial name for Blue Peacock

Green
 Green Apple – related to Window for measuring drift at sea
 Green Archer  – mortar-locating radar
 Green Bacon – experimental anti-aircraft radar for Bofors units
 Green Bamboo  – "hybrid" nuclear weapon design similar to Soviet RDS-6s
 Green Bottle – 1944 device for homing on U-boat radio signals (ARI.5574)
 Green Cheese  – nuclear anti-ship missile
 Green Flash  – Green Cheese’s replacement
 Green Flax  – Surface-to-Air Guided Weapon (SAGW) or surface-to-air missile (SAM); see Yellow Temple
 Green Garland  – infrared proximity fuze for Red Top
 Green Garlic  – Early Warning radar, also known as the AMES Type 80
 Green Ginger  – surveillance radars – combined installation of AMES Type 88 and AMES Type 89
 Green Granite  – thermonuclear warheads: Green Granite (small), and Green Granite (large), both tested at Operation Grapple
 Green Grass  – nuclear warhead for Violet Club and Yellow Sun Mark 1 bombs
 Green Hammock  – low-altitude bomber, Doppler navigation
 Green Janet  – portable, nuclear power plant; see Blue Bishop
 Green Light  – SAGW or SAM – see Short Sea Cat
 Green Lizard  – tube-launched SAM with variable geometry wings
 Green Mace  – 5-inch rapid firing anti-aircraft gun
 Green Minnow – Radiometer imager
 Green Palm  – ARI 18074 airborne VHF voice channel jammer with four pre-set channels, replaced in the Vulcan B2 by the I band jammer
 Green Salad – ARI 18044 wide-band VHF Homing equipment for the Avro Shackleton.
 Green Satin  – ARI 5851 airborne Doppler navigation radar unit
 Green Sparkler  – advanced SAM for the "Stage 2" program, became Blue Envoy
 Green Thistle – Infra-red homing system based on the German wartime Kielgerät
 Green Walnut  – blind bombing equipment
 Green Water  – pilotless interceptor/SAGW
 Green Willow  – EKCO AI Mk. 20 Fire Control radar, backup to ARI 5897 AI Mk. 23 Airborne Interception radar for the English Electric P.1 fighter
 Green Wizard  – instrument for calibrating anti-aircraft guns by measuring their muzzle velocity

Indigo
 Indigo Bracket  – S-band radar jamming system
 Indigo Corkscrew  – continuous wave radar, used with the Bristol Bloodhound and English Electric Thunderbird SAMs
 Indigo Hammer, formerly Blue Fox  – nuclear weapon

Jade
 Jade River   – continuous wave radar, developed from Indigo Corkscrew

Orange
 Orange Blossom – Probably a deliberate mis-identification of the Orange Crop pods fitted to 1312 Flight Hercules aircraft, (Pod-mounted electronic support measures used on the Hercules – maybe).
 Orange Cocktail – Experimental homing radar weapon from 1950s
 Orange Crop   – Racal MIR 2 ESM system for Royal Navy Lynx and Royal Navy Sea King (HAS.5 onwards but not Mk 4 "Junglies", who had the Racal Prophet lightweight RWR fitted to some, or to the Royal Navy SAR) helicopters and some Royal Air Force Hercules aircraft.
 Orange Harvest   – S and X band warning receiver fitted to Shackletons
 Orange Herald   – large boosted fission nuclear warhead, tested at Operation Grapple in 1957.
 Orange Nell   – short-range surface-to-air missile (SAGW)
 Orange Pippin   – Ferranti, anti-aircraft, fire-control radar
 Orange Poodle   – low altitude, OTHR (Over-the-Horizon) early-warning radar – abandoned
 Orange Putter   – ARI 5800 airborne passive radar warning receiver tuned to Soviet AI radars and fitted to Canberra and Valiant.
 Orange Reaper   – Racal "Kestrel" ESM system for Royal Navy Merlin helicopters
 Orange Tartan  – 'Auto-Astro' automated star navigation system (day) – see also Blue Sapphire (night).
 Orange Toffee – radar for Blue Envoy
 Orange William   – heavy anti-tank missile, canceled, later replaced by Swingfire
 Orange Yeoman   – Early Warning radar & guidance for Bristol Bloodhound SAGW – a.k.a. AMES Type 82

Pink
 Pink Hawk   – early name for Fairey Fireflash missile. As this was a "watered down" version of the Red Hawk, and thus pink, it is an example of Rainbow Codes having some implied meaning, rather than their usual purely deliberately meaningless choice.

Purple
 Purple Granite   – nuclear weapon – see Green Granite
 Purple Passion   – Sub-kiloton demolition mine project related to Violet Mist.
 Purple Possum   – VX Nerve Agent.

Red
 Red Achilles – flamethrower kit for the CT 25 armoured carrier
 Red Angel   – air-launched anti-ship weapon or "special bomb"
 Red Bacchus – mobile mixing plant for Red Vulcan flamethrower fuel
 Red Beard   – nuclear weapon
 Red Biddy – Infantry platoon anti-tank missile, cancelled 1953
 Red Brick – Experimental continuous-wave target illuminating radar
 Red Cabbage  – Naval radar
 Red Carpet  – X-band radar jammer
 Red Cat   –  Air-launched nuclear stand-off missile cancelled 11/54.
 Red Cheeks   – inertially guided bomb based on the work of Tubby Vielle
 Red Cyclops – flamethrower kit for the FV201 tank
 Red Dean   – large air-to-air missile
 Red Devil – experimental blind bombing system using Green Satin and Red Setter radars together
 Red Drover   – airborne radar – see Avro 730
 Red Duster   – Bristol Bloodhound surface-to-air missile
 Red Elsie – AP No. 8 anti-personnel mine, developed jointly with Canada.
 Red Eye (Redeye) – An American general-purpose infra-red homing missile
 Red Flag   – free-fall nuclear bomb – 'Improved Kiloton Bomb' – WE.177
 Red Flannel  – experimental Q band H2S
 Red Garter  – Cossor ARI 5818 airborne tail warning radar for the Vulcan, did not enter service
 Red Hawk   – large missile "downrated" to give Pink Hawk which became Blue Sky
 Red Heathen  – early SAM project, became Red Shoes and Red Duster
 Red Hebe   – air-to-air missile, a replacement for Red Dean
 Red Hermes – FV3702 armoured fuel trailer for flamethrower tanks
 Red Indian – analogue anti-aircraft fire control computer for Bofors L/70 gun.
 Red King  – two-barrel revolver cannon, developed alongside Red Queen. The name is likely not random, but instead a reference to its Oerlikon factory designation, RK, for Revolver Kanone.
 Red Light   – X band jammer for V Bombers, entered service as ARI 18146
 Red Neck   – airborne side-looking radar (SLAR), tested on the Victor a 40 foot long aerial under each wing. Flexing in flight corrupted the resolution. Cancelled 1962.
 Red Planet – infantry platoon anti-tank missile
 Red Queen  – rapid fire 42 mm revolver cannon anti-aircraft gun

 Red Rapier, Blue Rapier missiles  – see UB.109T
 Red Rose  – short-range, battlefield nuclear missile for the British Army – English Electric – later known as Blue Water; cancelled 1962
 Red Sea (AA)   – the AA predictor designed for use with the Green Mace automatic AA gun
 Red Setter   – experimental side-looking radar for V bombers
 Red Shoes   – see English Electric Thunderbird
 Red Shrimp   – ARI 18076 airborne high-band jammer fitted to Victor and Vulcan
 Red Snow   – nuclear weapon physics package – fitted to Yellow Sun Mk2 and Blue Steel
 Red Steer   – EKCO ARI 5919/ARI 5952 airborne tail warning radar – development of AI 20 Green Willow – fitted to Victor & Vulcan. The name likely refers to Jerry Steer at the RRE.
 Red Ticket   – associated with AI 17 radar
 Red Top   – air-to-air missile developed from the Firestreak Mk 4
 Red Tulip   – phase coherent radar Moving Target Indicator (MTI)
 Red Vulcan – flamethrower fuel mixture

Violet
 Violet Banner   – infrared seeker for Red Top
 Violet Club   – nuclear weapon
 Violet Friend   – simple ABM system ordered under AST.1135.
 Violet Mist   – truck-mounted nuclear land mine – formerly Blue Badger. Used the Red Beard physics package.
 Violet Picture   – UHF Homer, built by Plessey – Fitted to many RAF aircraft.
 Violet Vision   – nuclear warhead for Corporal missile – based on Red Beard

Yellow
 Yellow Anvil   – nuclear artillery shell warhead
 Yellow Aster   – H2S Mk 9A bombing radar, fitted to V bombers 
 Yellow Barley   – radar warning receiver
 Yellow Duckling   – infra-red submarine detector
 Yellow Feather – missile seeker
 Yellow Fever – fire control system for the Bofors L/70 anti-aircraft gun, comprising a Blue Diamond radar and a Red Indian analogue computer
 Yellow Gate   – Loral ESM for E-3D Sentry and Nimrod MR.2
 Yellow Jack   – Orange Pippin's radar component
 Yellow Lemon   – Doppler-navigation system for naval aircraft. Valve-based precursor to the transistorised Blue Jacket.
 Yellow River   – mobile tactical control radar for Bristol Bloodhound – a.k.a. AMES Type 83
 Yellow Sand   – anti-ship missile, possibly a precursor to Green Cheese
 Yellow Sun   – nuclear weapon casing
 Yellow Temple   – nuclear-armed SAGW development of Red Shoes
 Yellow Tiger   – Target illuminating radar used with the Thunderbird missile.
 Yellow Veil – ALQ-167 pod for Royal Navy Lynx.

Non-Rainbow codes

Several British military related terms have a similar "colour" format to Rainbow Codes, but are not since they do not refer to classified research projects, and some names have been used unofficially. These include:

 Black Banana – unofficial nickname for the Blackburn Buccaneer, originally named the Blackburn ANA (Blackburn Advanced Naval Aircraft).
 Black Beacon – The Orfordness Rotating Wireless Beacon, known simply as the Orfordness Beacon or sometimes the Black Beacon, was an early radio navigation system
 Blue Circle – sardonic name for concrete ballast for Buccaneer while awaiting Blue Parrot radar. Also used for Sea Harrier ballast in place of Blue Fox radar, and Tornado F.2 ballast. From the Blue Circle cement company.
 Blue Eric – improvised I band ECM jammer against the Fledermaus gun control radar during the Falklands War. Installed in the Harrier GR.3's starboard 30mm gun pod.
 Blue Yeoman – unofficial name for an experimental radar made from components of the Blue Riband and Orange Yeoman
 Green Goddess   – colloquial name for Civil Defence fire pump
 Green Meat – a 'spoof' SAM programme reported in the 1976 RAF Yearbook
 Green Parrot – unconfirmed low yield nuclear weapon mentioned in a 1981 New Statesman article by Duncan Campbell who later claimed that it was "probably" a copy of the US B57 nuclear bomb. The WE.177 has incorrectly been referred to as the Green Parrot by some authors. However Green Parrot was a NATO codename for the Soviet PFM-1 anti-infantry mine. Green Parrot was also the term for an admiral's barge, traditionally with a green-painted hull.
 Green Porridge   – RAF aircrew nickname for green-tinted H2S bombing radar display PPI image in Valiant, Victor & Vulcan
 Red Arrows   – RAF display team
 Red Devils   – Parachute Regiment display team
 Red Slab – joke name for a large ballast weight replacing the nose radar in Avro Vulcan XH558 in its return to flight as a civil display aircraft.
 Violet Fire  – Ultraviolet light fire detection system for Concorde engine bays.

See also
British military aircraft designation systems
Nuclear weapons and the United Kingdom
Rainbow Herbicides

References
Notes

Bibliography
Public Record Office, London. TNA AIR 2/17322 E51B (a)
 Vulcan's Hammer: V-Force Aircraft and Weapons Projects Since 1945 – Chris Gibson – 2011 –

External links
British nuclear weapon history

Rainbow Codes
Rainbow Codes
United Kingdom defence procurement
Rainbow Codes